The Château d'Arlempdes is a ruined castle in Arlempdes, Haute-Loire, France. It originally dates to the 12th century.

References

Buildings and structures completed in the 12th century
Châteaux in Haute-Loire
Ruined castles in Auvergne-Rhône-Alpes